Mikael Rickfors (born 4 December 1948) is a Swedish singer and songwriter. From 1968, he was the lead singer and bass guitarist in Swedish band Bamboo. The band released two singles before breaking up in 1970. Rickfors later performed with the British rock group The Hollies for about two years. At this period he displayed a wide vocal range and powerful chest voice. In later decades he took on a deliberate, slightly raspy tone. After his time in The Hollies, he started a somewhat successful solo career. The commercial highlight was the 1988 hit "Vingar" in Sweden.

The Hollies
Rickfors joined popular British rock group the Hollies in early 1972, replacing lead singer Allan Clarke who had left to pursue a solo career. Rickfors's richer baritone voice contrasted with Clarke's distinctive, piercing tenor. One of their hits that both performed was "He Ain't Heavy, He's My Brother". Rickfors performed this ballad with more dramatic tone and a slight vibrato, such as that displayed on The Midnight Special in 1973. His first single with the group, "The Baby", reached No. 26 in the UK as well as charting in various other territories.

The band followed up by releasing the album Romany, with one song, "Touch", written by Rickfors. Mikael also sang the band's hit "Magic Woman Touch" and the European 45 "Don't Leave The Child Alone" which he also wrote. The group received an unexpected boost when a single extracted from the group's previous album (featuring Clarke's vocals) shot up the American charts. The Hollies undertook their first major US tour without their signature vocalist. The tour was not a commercial success. The band then recorded a second album, Out on the Road which featured a major songwriting contribution from Rickfors. On both albums and on stage, Rickfors sang and played guitar, bass, congas and keyboard. Out on the Road was originally only released in Germany and Spain, but later was included in the multi-album Hollies box-set Changin’ Times released in 2015. Clarke rejoined the Hollies in July 1973, and Rickfors left the group.

Solo
In 1975 Rickfors released the first of eleven solo albums. 1988 saw the release of his hugely successful Vingar album. In 1990, he embarked on his first collaboration as part of the Swedish supergroup Grymlings (named after Rickfors' farm).

Among the artists who have recorded songs Mikael has written, in addition to the Hollies, are: Carlos Santana ("Daughter of the Night"), Cyndi Lauper ("Yeah Yeah" on her multi-million selling debut album), Percy Sledge ("Blue Night", "Misty Morning", "Shining Through the Rain", "Road of No Return"), Richie Havens, Jim Capaldi, Carla Olson, and Paul Jones (on his 2009 solo album Starting All Over Again). The title track of Chubby Tavares's first solo album, released on 17 July 2012, is the Rickfors song "Jealousy".

Discography

Solo
 Mikael Rickfors – 1975
 The Wheel – 1976
 Kickin' a Dream – 1979
 Tender Turns Tuff – 1981
 Rickfors Live – 1981
 Skin Is Thin – 1982
 Blue Fun – 1983
 Hearthunters – 1985
 Rickfors – 1986
 Vingar – 1988
 Judas River – 1991
 Happy Man Don't Kill – 1997
 Greatest Hits – 1999
 Lush Life – 2004
 Away Again – 2009

With bands

The Hollies 
Romany (1972)
Out on the Road (1973)
 "Rarities" (1988; includes "If It Wasn't For The Reason That I Love You").
 "The Mikael Rickfors Years" (2000; the Out On The Road album plus tracks from Romany and four additional songs).
 The Very Best Of The Hollies (1992; includes "Magic Woman Touch" and "The Baby").
 Changin' Times (2015) 5-CD box set featuring both Hollies albums on which Rickfors was the featured lead vocalist, plus the non-LP tracks "Papa Rain", "Witchy Woman", and "If It Wasn't For The Reason That I Love You".

Grymlings 
Grymlings (1990)
Grymlings vol. 2 (1992)
Grymlings vol. 3 (2005)

Mobile Unit 
Road Songs (2008)

References

External links

 Mikael Rickfors official homepage
 

1948 births
The Hollies members
Singers from Stockholm
Living people
English-language singers from Sweden
Swedish-language singers
Swedish male singers
Swedish bass guitarists
Male bass guitarists
Melodifestivalen contestants of 2009